Ali Mabrouk El Zaidi (born 13 January 1978) is a Libyan long-distance runner. He competed at four editions of the Olympic Games.

He finished eighteenth in the marathon at the 2007 World Championships.

Achievements

Personal bests
1500 metres - 3:47.18 min (2000) - national record.
3000 metres - 8:07.16 min (1999) - national record.
5000 metres - 13:34.99 min (2000) - national record.
10,000 metres - 28:48.53 min (1999) - national record.
Half marathon - 1:02:32 hrs (2007) - national record.
Marathon - 2:13:33 hrs (2008) - national record.

References

External links

1978 births
Living people
Libyan male long-distance runners
Libyan male marathon runners
Libyan male middle-distance runners
Athletes (track and field) at the 1996 Summer Olympics
Athletes (track and field) at the 2004 Summer Olympics
Athletes (track and field) at the 2008 Summer Olympics
Athletes (track and field) at the 2012 Summer Olympics
Olympic athletes of Libya
World Athletics Championships athletes for Libya
Libyan male cross country runners
Mediterranean Games bronze medalists for Libya
Mediterranean Games medalists in athletics
Athletes (track and field) at the 2009 Mediterranean Games